Zhangguanmiao is a town in Wuqi County, Yan'an, Shaanxi, China. Zhangguanmiao has a coal station.

Administrative divisions 
, Zhangguanmiao administers the following seven villages:
Zhangguanmiao Village
Qiqiao Village
Ligou Village
Liangcha Village
Qingliangsi Village
Baigou Village
Yangtai Village

See also
List of township-level divisions of Shaanxi
Wuqi County

References

Township-level divisions of Shaanxi
Wuqi County
Towns in China